Fabricio Gabriel Pedrozo (born 6 November 1992) is an Argentine professional footballer who plays as a forward for Super League Greece 2 club AEL.

Career
Pedrozo played for the academies of Unión de Puerto Iguazú and Proyecto Crecer before joining San Lorenzo. He previously had trials with Boca Juniors, Bordeaux and Real Madrid. Pedrozo featured three times in the Primera División, starting in a defeat to Tigre on 24 April 2011 prior to coming off the substitutes bench in fixtures with Newell's Old Boys and Banfield. In July 2012, Pedrozo completed a loan move to Primera B Metropolitana's Almagro. He made just one appearance in his first seven months, though eventually played fifteen times by the end of the 2012–13 campaign; which he also ended with six goals.

On 30 June 2013, Pedrozo joined Aldosivi of Primera B Nacional on loan. A year later, Pedrozo signed a two-season loan deal with Atlanta where he'd score eleven goals across the 2014 and 2015 seasons in the third tier. After a fourth spell away with Crucero del Norte in the first part of 2016, Pedrozo left to join Bolivian Primera División side The Strongest for a final loan out. Twenty-nine games, as well as six in the Copa Libertadores, arrived in Bolivia's top-flight alongside goals against Nacional Potosí, Blooming, San José and Bolívar; winning the 2016–17 Apertura in the process. Atlanta resigned Pedrozo in 2018.

Career statistics
.

Honours
The Strongest
Bolivian Primera División: 2016–17 Apertura

References

External links

1992 births
Living people
Argentine footballers
Argentine expatriate footballers
Sportspeople from Misiones Province
Association football forwards
Argentine Primera División players
Primera B Metropolitana players
Primera Nacional players
Bolivian Primera División players
Super League Greece 2 players
San Lorenzo de Almagro footballers
Club Almagro players
Aldosivi footballers
Club Atlético Atlanta footballers
Crucero del Norte footballers
The Strongest players
Athlitiki Enosi Larissa F.C. players
Expatriate footballers in Bolivia
Argentine expatriate sportspeople in Bolivia
Expatriate footballers in Greece
Argentine expatriate sportspeople in Greece